The Algoz River is a small river in the south central region of the Algarve, Portugal, which rises near the village of Tunes and passes through the town of Algoz, the seat of the civil parish of Algoz e Tunes.

Description 

The stream runs to the north of the town of Algoz from an easterly direction, and from the north west a tributary called Barranco Longo joins the stream. North west of the town a tributary joins the river which is called Barranco Longo. Further on the stream flows under the Alcantarilha bridge and the name of the stream changes to the Enxurrada or the Alcantarilha stream. This watercourse finally flows into the Atlantic Ocean between Pêra and Armação de Pêra.

References 

Rivers of Portugal
Rivers of the Algarve